Beastie Boys were an American hip hop group from New York City, formed in 1978. The group was composed of Michael "Mike D" Diamond (vocals, drums), Adam "MCA" Yauch (vocals, bass), and Adam "Ad-Rock" Horovitz (vocals, guitar, programming). Beastie Boys were formed out of members of experimental hardcore punk band the Young Aborigines in 1978, with Diamond as vocalist, Jeremy Shatan on bass guitar, John Berry on guitar, and Kate Schellenbach on drums. When Shatan left in 1981, Yauch replaced him on bass and the band changed their name to Beastie Boys. Berry left shortly thereafter and was replaced by Horovitz.

After achieving local success with the 1983 comedy hip hop single "Cooky Puss", Beastie Boys made a full transition to hip hop, and Schellenbach left. They toured with Madonna in 1985 and a year later released their debut album, Licensed to Ill (1986), the first rap record to top the Billboard 200 chart. Their second album, Paul's Boutique (1989), composed almost entirely of samples, was a commercial failure, but later received critical acclaim. Check Your Head (1992) and Ill Communication (1994) found mainstream success, followed by Hello Nasty (1998), To the 5 Boroughs (2004), The Mix-Up (2007), and Hot Sauce Committee Part Two (2011).

Beastie Boys have sold 20 million records in the United States and had seven platinum-selling albums from 1986 to 2004. They are the biggest-selling rap group since Billboard began recording sales in 1991. In 2012, they became the third rap group to be inducted into the Rock and Roll Hall of Fame. In the same year, Yauch died of cancer and Beastie Boys disbanded. The remaining members have released several retrospective works, including a book, a documentary, and a career-spanning compilation album.

History

1978–1983: Formation and early years 
The members of the group were raised in Jewish households growing up. Prior to forming Beastie Boys, Michael Diamond was part of a number of bands such as the Walden Jazz Band, BAN, and the Young Aborigines. Beastie Boys formed in July 1981 when the Young Aborigines bassist Jeremy Shatan left New York City for the summer and the remaining members Michael Diamond, John Berry and Kate Schellenbach formed a new hardcore punk band with Adam Yauch.

In a 2007 interview with Charlie Rose, Yauch recalled that it was Berry who suggested the name Beastie Boys. Although the band stated that "Beastie" is an acronym standing for "Boys Entering Anarchistic States Towards Inner Excellence", in the Charlie Rose interview, both Yauch and Diamond acknowledged that the acronym was an "afterthought" conceived after the name was chosen. The band supported Bad Brains, the Dead Kennedys, the Misfits and Reagan Youth at venues such as CBGB, A7, Trudy Hellers Place and Max's Kansas City, playing at the latter venue on its closing night. In November 1982, Beastie Boys recorded the 7-inch EP Polly Wog Stew at 171A studios, an early recorded example of New York hardcore.

On November 13, 1982, Beastie Boys played Philip Pucci's birthday for the purposes of his short concert film, Beastie. Pucci held the concert in Bard College's Preston Drama Dance Department Theatre. This performance marked Beastie Boys' first on screen appearance in a published motion picture. Pucci's concept for Beastie was to distribute a mixture of both a half dozen 16 mm Bell & Howell Filmo cameras, and 16 mm Bolex cameras to audience members and ask that they capture Beastie Boys performance from the audience's own point of view while a master sync sound camera filmed from the balcony of the abandoned theater where the performance was held. The opening band for that performance was the Young and the Useless, which featured Adam Horovitz as the lead singer. A one-minute clip of Beastie was subsequently excerpted and licensed by Beastie Boys for use in the "Egg Raid on Mojo" segment of the "Skills to Pay the Bills" long-form home video released by Capitol Records. "Skills to Pay the Bills" later went on to be certified Gold by the Recording Industry Association of America (RIAA). Berry left the group in 1982 (later forming Thwig, Big Fat Love and Bourbon Deluxe) and was replaced by Horovitz, who had become close friends with Beastie Boys.

The band also recorded and then performed its first hip hop track, "Cooky Puss", based on a prank call by the group to a Carvel Ice Cream franchise in 1983. It was a part of the new lineup's first EP, also called Cooky Puss, which was the first piece of work that showed their incorporation of the underground rap phenomenon and the use of samples. It quickly became a hit in New York underground dance clubs and night clubs. After "Beastie Revolution" was later sampled in a British Airways commercial, Beastie Boys threatened to sue them over the use of the song, and the airline immediately paid them $40,000 in royalties.

1984–1987: Def Jam years and Licensed to Ill 
Following the success of "Cooky Puss", the band began to incorporate rap into their sets. They hired a DJ for their live shows, New York University student Rick Rubin, who began producing records soon thereafter. "I met Mike first," Rubin recalled. "I thought he was an arrogant asshole. Through spending time with the Beasties I grew to see that they had this great sense of humor. It wasn't that they were assholes, and even if it was, they were funny with it." Rubin formed Def Jam Recordings with fellow NYU student Russell Simmons, and approached the band about producing them for his new label. As the band was transitioning to hip hop, Schellenbach was fired in 1984, with Diamond taking over on drums. In their 2018 memoir, Ad-Rock expressed regret for firing Schellenbach, which he attributed to her not fitting with the "new tough-rapper-guy identity".

The band's 12-inch single "Rock Hard" (1984) was the second Def Jam record crediting Rubin as producer (the first was "It's Yours" by T La Rock and Jazzy Jay). On July 22, 1986,  Beastie Boys opened for John Lydon's post-Sex Pistols band Public Image Ltd., and supported Madonna on her North American The Virgin Tour. Then headlining with Fishbone and Murphy's Law with DJ Hurricane and later in the year, the group was on the Raising Hell tour with Run-DMC, Whodini, LL Cool J, and the Timex Social Club. Thanks to this exposure, "Hold It Now, Hit It" charted on Billboards US R&B and dance charts. "She's on It" from the Krush Groove soundtrack continued in a rap/metal vein while a double A-side 12", "Paul Revere/The New Style", was released at the end of the year.

The band recorded Licensed to Ill in 1986 and released it on November 15, 1986. The album was favorably reviewed by Rolling Stone magazine. Licensed to Ill became one of the best-selling rap albums of the 1980s and the first rap album to go number 1 on the Billboard 200 chart, where it stayed for five weeks. It also reached number 2 on the Top R&B album chart. It was Def Jam's fastest selling debut record to date and sold over nine million copies. The fourth single, "(You Gotta) Fight for Your Right (To Party!)", reached number 7 on the US Billboard Hot 100. Although the group has sold over 26 million records in the US, this is their only single to peak in the US top ten or top twenty. The accompanying video (directed by Ric Menello and Adam Dubin) became an MTV staple. Another song from the album, "No Sleep till Brooklyn", peaked at number 14 on the UK Singles Chart.

The band took the Licensed to Ill tour around the world the following year. The tour was troubled by lawsuits and arrests, with the band accused of provoking the crowd. This culminated in a notorious gig at the Royal Court Theatre, Liverpool, England, on May 30, 1987, that erupted into a riot approximately 10 minutes after the group hit the stage and the arrest of Adam Horovitz by Merseyside Police. He was charged with assault causing grievous bodily harm.

1988–1989: Move to Capitol Records and Paul's Boutique
In 1988, Beastie Boys appeared in Tougher Than Leather, a film directed by Rubin as a star vehicle for Run-D.M.C. and Def Jam Recordings. After Def Jam stopped paying them for work they'd already done and were owed money for, Beastie Boys left Def Jam and signed with Capitol Records.

The second Beastie Boys album, Paul's Boutique, was released on July 25, 1989. Produced by the Dust Brothers, it blends eclectic samples and has been described as an early work of experimental hip hop. It failed to match the sales of Licensed to Ill, reaching number 14 on the US album charts, but later attracted acclaim; Rolling Stone ranked it number 156 on its list of the 500 Greatest Albums of All Time.

1990–1996: Check Your Head and Ill Communication

Check Your Head was recorded in the band's G-Son studio in Atwater Village, California, and released on its Grand Royal record label. The band was influenced to play instruments on this album by Dutch group Urban Dance Squad; with Mike D on drums, Yauch on bass, Horovitz on guitar and Mark Ramos Nishita ("Keyboard Money Mark") on keyboards. Mario Caldato, Jr., who had helped in the production of Paul's Boutique, engineered the record and became a longtime collaborator. Check Your Head was released in 1992 and was certified double Platinum in the US and peaked at number 10 on the Billboard 200. The single "So What'cha Want" reached number 93 on the Billboard Hot 100 and charted on both the Rap and Modern Rock Chart, while the album's first single, "Pass the Mic", peaked at number 38 on the Hot Dance Music chart. The album also introduced a more experimental direction, with funk and jazz inspired songs including "Lighten Up" and "Something's Got to Give". The band returned to their hardcore punk roots for the song "Time for Livin'", a cover of a 1974 Sly and the Family Stone song. The addition of instruments and the harder rock sound of the album could be considered a precursor to the nu metal genre of music to come out in the later half of the 1990s.

Beastie Boys signed an eclectic roster of artists to their Grand Royal label, including Luscious Jackson, Sean Lennon, and Australian artist Ben Lee. The group owned Grand Royal Records until 2001. Grand Royal's first independent release was Luscious Jackson's album In Search of Manny in 1993. Also in 1993, the band contributed the track "It's the New Style" (with DJ Hurricane) to the AIDS benefit album No Alternative, produced by the Red Hot Organization.

Beastie Boys also published Grand Royal Magazine, with the first edition in 1993 featuring a cover story on Bruce Lee, artwork by George Clinton, and interviews with Kareem Abdul-Jabbar and A Tribe Called Quest's MC Q-Tip. The 1995 issue of the magazine contained a memorable piece on the mullet. The Oxford English Dictionary cites this as the first published use of the term, along with the lyrics from the band's 1994 song, "Mullet Head". That term was not heard in the 1980s, even though that decade has retroactively been hailed as the mullet's peak in popularity. The OED says that the term was "apparently coined, and certainly popularized, by US hip-hop group Beastie Boys". Grand Royal Magazine is also responsible for giving British band Sneaker Pimps their name.

Ill Communication, released in 1994, saw Beastie Boys' return to the top of the charts when the album debuted at number 1 on the Billboard 200 and peaked at number 2 on the R&B/hip hop album chart. The single "Sabotage" became a hit on the modern rock charts and the music video, directed by Spike Jonze, received extensive play on MTV. "Get It Together" reached the top 10 on the Billboard Hot 100. Also in 1994, the band released Some Old Bullshit, featuring the band's early independent material, which made it to number 46 on the Billboard Independent Albums chart.

Beastie Boys headlined at Lollapalooza—an American travelling music festival—in 1994, together with The Smashing Pumpkins. In addition, the band performed three concerts (in Los Angeles, New York City, and Washington, D.C.) to raise money for the Milarepa Fund and dedicated the royalties from "Shambala" and "Bodhisattva Vow" from the Ill Communication to the cause. The Milarepa Fund aims to raise awareness of Tibetan human rights issues and the exile of the Dalai Lama. In 1996, Yauch organized the largest rock benefit show since 1985's Live Aid – the Tibetan Freedom Concert, a two-day festival at Golden Gate Park in San Francisco that attracted over 100,000 attendees.

In 1995, the popularity of Beastie Boys was underlined when tickets for an arena tour went on sale in the US and Madison Square Garden and Chicago's Rosemont Horizon sold out within 30 minutes. One dollar from each ticket sold went through Milarepa to local charities in each city on the tour. Beastie Boys toured South America and Southeast Asia for the first time. The band also released Aglio e Olio, a collection of eight songs lasting just 11 minutes harking back to their punk roots, in 1995. The In Sound from Way Out!, a collection of previously released jazz/funk instrumentals, was released on Grand Royal in 1996 with the title and artwork a homage to an album by electronic pop music pioneers Perrey and Kingsley.

In 1992, Beastie Boys decided to sample portions of the sound recording of "Choir" by James Newton in various renditions of their song "Pass the Mic". The band did not obtain a license from Newton to use the composition. Pursuant to their license from ECM Records, Beastie Boys digitally sampled the opening six seconds of Newton's sound recording of "Choir", and repeated this six-second sample as a background element throughout their song. Newton brought suit, claiming that the band infringed his copyright in the underlying composition of "Choir". The district court granted Beastie Boys summary judgment. The district court said that no license was required because the three-note segment of "Choir" lacked the requisite originality and was therefore not copyrightable. The decision was affirmed on appeal.

1997–2001: Hello Nasty

Beastie Boys began work on the album Hello Nasty at the G-Son studios, Los Angeles in 1995, but continued to produce and record it in New York City after Yauch moved to Manhattan in 1996. The album displayed a substantial shift in musical feel, with the addition of Mix Master Mike. The album featured bombastic beats, rap samples, and experimental sounds. Released on July 14, 1998, Hello Nasty earned first week sales of 681,000 in the US and went straight to number 1 in the US, the UK, Germany, Australia, the Netherlands, New Zealand, and Sweden. The album achieved number 2 rank on the charts in Canada and Japan, and reached top-ten chart positions in Austria, Switzerland, Ireland, Belgium, Finland, France and Israel.

Beastie Boys won two Grammy Awards in 1999, receiving the Grammy Award for Best Alternative Music Album for Hello Nasty as well as the Grammy Award for Best Rap Performance by a Duo or Group for "Intergalactic". This was the first and, as of 2008, only time that a band had won awards in both rap and alternative categories.

Also at the 1998 MTV Video Music Awards they won the Michael Jackson Video Vanguard Award for their contribution to music videos. The following year at the 1999 MTV Video Music Awards they also won the award for Best Hip Hop Video for their hit song "Intergalactic". Beastie Boys used both appearances at the Video Music Awards to make politically charged speeches of considerable length to the sizable MTV audiences. At the 1998 ceremony, Yauch addressed the issue of Muslim people being stereotyped as terrorists and that most people of the Muslim faith are not terrorists. These comments were made in the wake of the US Embassy bombings that had occurred in both Kenya and Tanzania only a month earlier. At the 1999 ceremony in the wake of the horror stories that were coming out of Woodstock 99, Adam Horovitz addressed the fact that there had been many cases of sexual assaults and rapes at the festival, suggesting the need for bands and festivals to pay much more attention to the security details at their concerts.

Beastie Boys started an arena tour in 1998. Through Ian C. Rogers, the band made live downloads of their performances available for their fans, but were temporarily thwarted when Capitol Records removed them from its website. Beastie Boys was one of the first bands who made MP3 downloads available on their website. The group got a high level of response and public awareness as a result including a published article in The Wall Street Journal on the band's efforts.

On September 28, 1999, Beastie Boys joined Elvis Costello to play "Radio Radio" on the 25th anniversary season of Saturday Night Live.

Beastie Boys released The Sounds of Science, a two-CD anthology of their works in 1999. This album reached number  19 on the Billboard 200, number 18 in Canada, and number 14 on the R&B/Hip Hop chart. The one new song, the single "Alive", reached number 11 on the Billboard Modern Rock chart.

In 2000, Beastie Boys had planned to co-headline the "Rhyme and Reason Tour" with Rage Against the Machine and Busta Rhymes, but the tour was canceled when drummer Mike D sustained a  serious injury due to a bicycle accident. The official diagnosis was fifth-degree acromioclavicular joint dislocation; he needed surgery and extensive rehabilitation. By the time he recovered, Rage Against the Machine had disbanded, although they would reunite seven years later.

Under the name Country Mike, Mike D recorded an album, Country Mike's Greatest Hits, and gave it to friends and family for Christmas in 2000. Adam "Ad-Rock" Horovitz's side project BS 2000 released Simply Mortified in 2001.

In October 2001, after the September 11, 2001 attacks, Beastie Boys organized and headlined the New Yorkers Against Violence Concert at the Hammerstein Ballroom.

2002–2008: To the 5 Boroughs and The Mix-Up

In 2002, Adam Yauch started building a new studio facility, Oscilloscope Laboratories, in downtown Manhattan, New York and the band started work on a new album there. The band released a protest song, "In a World Gone Mad", against the 2003 Iraq war as a free download on several websites, including the Milarepa website, the MTV website, MoveOn.org, and Win Without War. The 19th and 20th Tibetan Freedom Concerts were held in Tokyo and Taipei, Beastie Boys' first Taiwan appearance. Beastie Boys also headlined the Coachella Valley Music and Arts Festival.

Their single, "Ch-Check It Out", debuted on The O.C. in "The Vegas" episode from Season 1, which aired April 28, 2004.

To the 5 Boroughs was released worldwide on June 15, 2004. It was the first album the band produced themselves and reached number 1 on the Billboard albums chart, number 2 in the UK and Australia, and number 3 in Germany. The first single from the album, "Ch-Check It Out", reached number 1 in Canada and on the US Modern Rock Tracks chart.

The album was the cause of some controversy with allegations that it installed spyware when inserted into the CD drive of a computer. The band denied this allegation, defending that there is no copy protection software on the albums sold in the US and UK. While there is Macrovision CDS-200 copy protection software installed on European copies of the album, this is standard practice for all European releases on EMI/Capitol Records released in Europe, and it does not install spyware or any form of permanent software.

The band stated in mid-2006 that they were writing material for their next album and would be producing it themselves.

Speaking to British music weekly NME (April 26, 2007), Diamond revealed that a new album was to be called The Mix-Up. Despite initial confusion regarding whether the album would have lyrics as opposed to being purely instrumental, the Mic-To-Mic blog reported that Capitol Records had confirmed it would be strictly instrumental and erroneously reported a release date scheduled for July 10, 2007. (The album was eventually released June 26, as originally reported.) On May 1, 2007, this was further cemented by an e-mail sent to those on the band's mailing list – explicitly stating that the album would be all instrumental:

The band subsequently confirmed the new album and announced a short tour that focused on festivals as opposed to a traditional tour, including the likes of Sónar (Spain), Roskilde (Denmark), Hurricane/Southside (Germany), Bestival (Isle of Wight), Electric Picnic (Ireland) and Open'er Festival (Poland). Beastie Boys performed at the UK leg of Live Earth July 7, 2007 at Wembley Stadium, London with "Sabotage", "So What'cha Want", "Intergalactic", and "Sure Shot".

They worked with Reverb, a non-profit environmental organization, on their 2007 summer tour, and headlined the Langerado Music Festival in South Florida on Friday, March 7, 2008. The band won a Grammy for The Mix-Up in the "Best Pop Instrumental Album" category at the 50th Annual Grammy Awards in 2008.

2009–2012: Hot Sauce Committee

In February 2009, Yauch revealed their forthcoming new album had taken the band's sound in a "bizarre" new direction, saying "It's a combination of playing and sampling stuff as we're playing, and also sampling pretty obscure records." The tentative title for the record was Tadlock's Glasses, of which Yauch explained the inspiration behind the title:

On May 25, 2009, it was announced during an interview on Late Night with Jimmy Fallon that the name of their new album would be Hot Sauce Committee and was set for release on September 15 (with the track listing of the album announced through their mailing list on June 23). The album included a collaboration with Santigold who co-wrote and sang with the band on the track "Don't Play No Game That I Can't Win".

In June, the group appeared at Bonnaroo Music and Arts Festival and performed the new single from the album titled "Too Many Rappers" alongside rapper Nas who appears on the track. It would be the last live performance by Beastie Boys as a trio. The group would have toured the UK later in the year in support of the new record.

Speaking to Drowned in Sound, Beastie Boys revealed that Part 2 was done. Mike D also hinted it may be released via unusual means:

On July 20, Yauch announced on the band's official YouTube channel and through the fan mailing list, the cancellation of several tour dates and the postponement of the new album due to the discovery of a cancerous tumor in his parotid gland and a lymph node. The group also had to cancel their co-headlining gig at the Osheaga Festival in Montreal and also another headlining spot for the first night of the All Points West Festival in Jersey City, New Jersey.

In late October 2010, Beastie Boys sent out two emails regarding the status of Hot Sauce Committee Pts. 1 and 2 to their online mailing list. An email dated October 18 read: "Although we regret to inform you that Hot Sauce Committee Part 1 will continue to be delayed indefinitely, Hot Sauce Committee Part 2 will be released on time as originally planned in spring of 2011." One week later, a second email was sent out, reading as follows:

The official release dates were April 27, 2011, for Japan; April 29 in the UK and Europe, and May 3, 2011, in the US. The third single for the album "Make Some Noise" was made available for download on April 11, 2011, as well as a limited edition 7-inch vinyl single for Record Store Day five days later with a Passion Pit remix of the track as a b-side. The track was leaked online on April 6 and subsequently made available via their blog.

On April 22, Beastie Boys emailed out the cryptic message "This Sat, 10:35 am EST – Just listen, listen, listen to the beat box". A day later, they live streamed their album online via beatbox inside Madison Square Garden.

The band was announced as an inductee into the Rock and Roll Hall of Fame in December 2011. They were inducted by Chuck D and LL Cool J on April 14, 2012. Yauch was too sick to attend the ceremony, having been admitted to NewYork–Presbyterian Hospital the same day, therefore the group didn't perform; instead Black Thought, Travie from Gym Class Heroes and Kid Rock performed a medley of their songs. Diamond and Horovitz accepted and read a speech that Yauch had written.

2012–present: Deaths of Yauch and Berry, and disbandment
On May 4, 2012, Yauch died from cancer at the age of 47. Mike D told Rolling Stone that Beastie Boys had recorded new music in late 2011, but did not say if these recordings would be released. He also said that Beastie Boys would likely disband due to the death of MCA, though he was open to making new music with Ad-Rock and that "Yauch would genuinely want us to try whatever crazy thing we wanted but never got around to". In June 2014, Mike D confirmed that he and Ad-Rock would not make music under the Beastie Boys name again.

Founding Beastie Boys guitarist John Berry died on May 19, 2016, aged 52, as a result of frontotemporal dementia, following several years of ill health. He was credited with naming the band Beastie Boys and played guitar on the first EP. The first Beastie Boys show took place at Berry's loft.

Yauch's will forbids the use of Beastie Boys music in advertisements. In June 2014, Beastie Boys won a lawsuit against Monster Energy for using their music in a commercial without permission. They were awarded $1.7 million in damages and $668,000 for legal fees.

In October 2018, Mike D and Ad-Rock released a memoir, Beastie Boys Book, recounting events throughout the group's history. The book was adapted into a documentary in April 2020, titled Beastie Boys Story, directed by Spike Jonze and premiered on Apple TV+. The book and documentary were also complemented by the compilation album Beastie Boys Music, released in October 2020.

Tibetan Freedom Concert 

In 1994, Yauch and activist Erin Potts organized the Tibetan Freedom Concert in order to raise awareness of humans rights abuses by the Chinese government on the Tibetan people. Yauch became aware of this after hiking in Nepal and speaking with Tibetan refugees. The events became annual, and shortly after went international with acts such as Live, Mike Mills and Michael Stipe of R.E.M., Rage Against the Machine, The Smashing Pumpkins, and U2.

Musical style, influences, and legacy
Originally a hardcore punk band, Beastie Boys had largely abandoned the genre in favor of hip hop and rap rock by the time work began on their debut studio album Licensed to Ill. The group mixed elements of hip hop, punk, funk, electro, jazz and Latin music into their music. They have also been described as alternative hip hop,  and punk rap.

Around the time of the release of their debut album, Licensed to Ill, Mike D started to appear on stage and in publicity photographs wearing a large Volkswagen emblem attached to a chain-link necklace. This started a rash of thefts of the emblem from vehicles around the world as fans tried to emulate him. A controversial concert in Columbus, Georgia in 1987 led to the passage of a lewdness ordinance in that city.

Beastie Boys are considered very influential in both the hip hop and rock music scenes, with artists such as Eminem, Rage Against the Machine, Hed PE, Sublime, and Blur citing them as an influence. Beastie Boys have had four albums reach the top of the Billboard album charts (Licensed to Ill, Ill Communication, Hello Nasty and To the 5 Boroughs) since 1986. In the November 2004 issue, Rolling Stone named "Sabotage" the 475th song on their 500 Greatest Songs of All Time list.
In their April 2005 issue, Rolling Stone ranked them number 77 on their list of the 100 Greatest Artists of All Time. VH1 ranked them number 89 on their list of their 100 Greatest Artists of All Time. On September 27, 2007, it was announced that Beastie Boys were one of the nine nominees for the 2008 Rock and Roll Hall of Fame Inductions. In December 2011, they were announced to be official 2012 inductees.

Beastie Boys have many high-profile longtime fans, including UFC president Dana White, who has a hand-signed bass guitar signed by all three members in his office and a copy of the Beastie Boys book. Speaking on the death of Adam Yauch, White said, "I seriously haven't been impacted by a death in a long time like I was with the Beastie Boys". Actor Seth Rogen, who appeared in the video for "Make Some Noise", also said, "I'm a huge Beastie Boys fan and they just called and asked if I wanted to be a part of it, and I said yes without hesitation. I didn't need to hear anything. I didn't need to see anything, any concepts. I was just like, 'I will literally do anything you ask me to do". Ben Stiller was seen in the crowd for the DVD release Awesome; I Fuckin' Shot That! and featured Horovitz in his movie While We're Young, where he said, "I'm a huge Beastie Boys fan, so doing that, for me, was beyond anything". Eminem was highly influenced by the Beastie Boys and cited them alongside LL Cool J as being the reason he got into rap. During an interview with MTV after the death of Yauch, he said, "Adam Yauch brought a lot of positivity into the world and I think it's obvious to anyone how big of an influence the Beastie Boys were on me and so many others. They are trailblazers and pioneers and Adam will be sorely missed. My thoughts and prayers are with his family, Mike D., and Ad-Rock." His album cover for Kamikaze paid homage to Licensed to Ill and he also paid homage in his "Berzerk" video. In an interview with Rolling Stone, Beavis and Butt-Head creator Mike Judge acknowledged he was a fan of the band, citing his favorite song as "Fight for Your Right", as the Beastie Boys appeared on Beavis and Butt-Head on numerous occasions. Kid Rock wrote an in-depth tribute to Yauch after being influenced by the band, which said, "I thought I was the 4th member of Beastie Boys in 7th grade. You couldn't tell me I wasn't. The first time I ever saw them on stage was a very early show of theirs before Licensed to Ill came out, opening for Run DMC at Joe Louis Arena. My jaw dropped to the floor!".

In 2020, Spin Magazine ranked Beastie Boys as the 12th most influential artist of the previous 35 years.

Sampling lawsuit

In 2003, Beastie Boys were involved in the landmark sampling decision, Newton v. Diamond. In that case, a federal judge ruled that the band was not liable for sampling James Newton's "Choir" in their track, "Pass the Mic". The sample used is the six-second flute stab. In short, Beastie Boys cleared the sample but obtained only the rights to use the sound recording and not the composition rights to the song "Choir". In the decision, the judge found that:

Band members

Members
 John Berry – guitars (1981–1982; died 2016)
 Mike D – vocals, drums (1981–2012)
 Kate Schellenbach – drums, percussion (1981–1984)
 MCA – vocals, bass (1981–2012; died 2012)
 Ad-Rock – vocals, guitars (1982–2012)

Touring musicians
 DJ Double R – disc jockey (1984–1985)
 Doctor Dré – disc jockey (1986)
 DJ Hurricane – disc jockey (1986–1997)
 Eric Bobo – percussion, drums (1992–1996)
 Money Mark (Mark Ramos-Nishita) – keyboards, vocals (1992–2012)
 Amery "AWOL" Smith – drums, backing vocals, percussion (1992–1998)
 Alfredo Ortiz – drums, percussion (1996–2012)
 Mix Master Mike – disc jockey, backing vocals (1998–2012)

Timeline

Touring Members Timeline

Discography

Studio albums
 Licensed to Ill (1986)
 Paul's Boutique (1989)
 Check Your Head (1992)
 Ill Communication (1994)
 Hello Nasty (1998)
 To the 5 Boroughs (2004)
 The Mix-Up (2007)
 Hot Sauce Committee Part Two (2011)

Tours
 The Virgin Tour (1985) (supporting Madonna)
 Raising Hell Tour (1986) (supporting Run-D.M.C.)
 Licensed to Ill Tour (1987) (with Public Enemy)
 Together Forever Tour (1987) (with Run-D.M.C.)
 Check Your Head Tour (1992)  (with Cypress Hill, Rollins Band, Firehose, and Basehead)
 Ill Communication Tour (1994–1995)
 In the Round Tour (1998–1999) (with A Tribe Called Quest and Money Mark)
 To the 5 Boroughs Tour (2004)
 The Mix-Up Tour (2007–2008)

Awards and nominations
Grammy Awards

|-
|1992
|Check Your Head
|Best Rap Performance by a Duo or Group
|
|-
|1995
|"Sabotage"
|Best Hard Rock Performance
|
|-
|Rowspan="2"|1999
|"Intergalactic"
|Best Rap Performance by a Duo or Group
|
|-
|Hello Nasty
|Best Alternative Music Album
|
|-
|2001
|"Alive"
|Best Rap Performance by a Duo or Group
|
|-
|rowspan="2"|2005
|"Ch-Check It Out"
|Best Rap Performance by a Duo or Group
|
|-
|To The 5 Boroughs
|Best Rap Album
|
|-
|rowspan="2"|2008
|"Off the Grid"
|Best Pop Instrumental Performance
|
|-
|The Mix-Up
|Best Contemporary Instrumental Album
|
|-
|2010
|"Too Many Rappers" (featuring Nas)
|Best Rap Performance by a Duo or Group
|
|}

MTV Video Music Awards

|-
|rowspan="5"|1994
|rowspan="5"|"Sabotage"
|Video of the Year
|
|-
|Best Group Video
|
|-
|Breakthrough Video
|
|-
|Best Direction (Director: Spike Jonze)
|
|-
|Viewer's Choice
|
|-
|1998
|Beastie Boys
|Michael Jackson Video Vanguard Award
|
|-
|1999
|"Intergalactic"
|Best Hip-Hop Video
|
|-
|2009
|"Sabotage"
|Best Video (That Should Have Won a Moonman)
|
|-
|rowspan="2"|2011
|rowspan="2"|"Make Some Noise"
|Video of the Year
|
|-
|Best Direction (Director: Adam Yauch)
|
|}

MTV Europe Music Awards

|-
|1994
|Beastie Boys
|Best Group
|
|-
|rowspan="4"|1998
|"Intergalactic"
|Best Video
|
|-
|Hello Nasty
|Best Album
|
|-
|rowspan="2"|Beastie Boys
|Best Group
|
|-
|Best Hip-Hop
|
|-
|1999
|Beastie Boys
|Best Hip-Hop
|
|-
|rowspan="2"|2004
|rowspan="2"|Beastie Boys
|Best Group
|
|-
|Best Hip-Hop
|
|-
|2011
|"Make Some Noise"
|Best Video
|
|}

MTV Video Music Awards Japan

|-
|2005
|"Ch-Check It Out"
|Best Hip-Hop Video
|
|-
|2009
|Beastie Boys
|MTV Street Icon Award
|
|}

Filmography 
 Krush Groove (1985)
 Tougher Than Leather (1988)
 Futurama episode "Hell Is Other Robots" (1999)
 Awesome; I Fuckin' Shot That! (2006)
 Fight for Your Right Revisited (2011)
 Beastie Boys Story (2020)

Notes

References

Further reading

External links 

 
 
 Beastie Boys Lyrics Annotated – Beastie Boys lyrics laid out with annotated comments explaining popular culture and historical references as well as known samples.
 
 

Beastie Boys
Alternative hip hop groups
Hardcore hip hop groups
Hip hop groups from New York City
Jewish hip hop groups
Jewish punk rock groups
Rap rock groups
Rapcore groups
Hardcore punk groups from New York (state)
Alternative rock groups from New York (state)
Musical groups from New York City
Capitol Records artists
Def Jam Recordings artists
ROIR artists
Grand Royal artists
Grammy Award winners for rap music
MTV Europe Music Award winners
Feminist musicians
1981 establishments in New York City
Musical groups established in 1981
Musical groups disestablished in 2012